Victor Matveevich Buchstaber (born 1 April 1943, Tashkent, Soviet Union) is a Soviet and Russian mathematician known for his work on algebraic topology, homotopy theory, and mathematical physics.

Work
Buchstaber's first research work was in cobordism theory. He calculated the differential in the Atiyah-Hirzebruch spectral sequence in K-theory and complex cobordism theory, constructed Chern-Dold characters and the universal Todd genus in cobordism, and gave an alternative effective solution of the Milnor-Hirzebruch problem. He went on to develop a theory of double-valued formal groups that led to the calculation of cobordism rings of complex manifolds having symplectic coverings and to the explicit construction of what are now known as  Buchstaber manifolds.

He worked on the deformation theory for mappings to groups, which led to the solution of the Novikov problem on multiplicative subgroups in operator doubles, and to construction of the quantum group of complex cobordisms. He went on to treat problems related both with algebraic geometry and integrable systems. He is also well known for his work on sigma-functions on universal spaces of Jacobian varieties of algebraic curves that give effective solutions of important integrable systems. Buchstaber created an algebro-functional theory of symmetric products of spaces and described algebraic varieties of polysymmetric polynomials.

Academic career
Buchstaber gained his Ph.D. in 1970 under Sergei Novikov and Dr. Sci. in 1984 from Moscow State University. He is currently a professor at the Faculty of Mathematics and Mechanics, Moscow State University, and an emeritus professor at the School of Mathematics, University of Manchester.  He has supervised more than 30 Ph.D. students, including Serge Ochanine, Iosif Polterovich, Taras Panov and Alexander Gaifullin.

In 1974 Buchstaber was an Invited Speaker at the International Congress of Mathematicians in Vancouver (but he did not give a lecture there). In 2004 was elected a corresponding fellow of the Royal Society of Edinburgh. In 2006 he was elected a corresponding member of the Russian Academy of Sciences.

Works
  
 Victor Buchstaber and Taras Panov, Toric Topology,  American Mathematical Society, Providence, RI, 2015.

References

External links
Home page at Russian Academy of Sciences 
Birthday tribute in Moscow Mathematical Journal 

1943 births
Living people
Russian mathematicians
Topologists
Moscow State University alumni
Academic staff of Moscow State University
Corresponding Members of the Russian Academy of Sciences
Academics of the University of Manchester
Scientists from Tashkent
Fellows of the Royal Society of Edinburgh